James Whitfield (December 15, 1791 – June 25, 1875) was an American politician. He served as the Governor of Mississippi from November 24, 1851, to January 10, 1852. He also served in both houses of the Mississippi Legislature.

Background

He served until United States Senator Henry S. Foote, who had been elected governor, could complete his service in the Senate and resign from that body. Whitfield was a Democrat. He donated  of land in the northern part of the state to facilitate the creation of what is simultaneously the state's largest psychiatric facility and hospital, now known as Mississippi State Hospital. His Columbus, Mississippi plantation was sold in 1852 to Thomas Carleton Billups and is known today as The Billups Whitfield Place.

In the same year, he built a house in Columbus known as Snowdoun, featured annually on a local tour of homes. It was here that Jefferson Davis stayed while campaigning across the state for the U.S. Senate. He gave a speech from the balcony of this house. The home was later visited by author Julian Street as he traveled across the Southern U.S. compiling notes for his book American Adventures in 1915.

Notes

Sources

External links
James Whitfield at National Governors Association 
James Whitfield: Eighteenth Governor of Mississippi: November 1851 – January 1852. Mississippi History

1791 births
1875 deaths
Democratic Party members of the Mississippi House of Representatives
Democratic Party Mississippi state senators
Democratic Party governors of Mississippi
Whitfield family
19th-century American politicians